Edward Shepard may refer to:
Edward M. Shepard (1850–1911), American politician
Edward V. Shepard (1866–1937), American authority on the game of bridge

See also
Edward Sheppard (1891–1962), English cricketeer
Edward Shepherd (died 1747), English architect
Edwin M. Shepard (1843–1904), American admiral